Ibarama is a municipality in the state of Rio Grande do Sul, Brazil.

The municipality contains part of the  Quarta Colônia State Park, created in 2005.
The municipality is partly flooded by the reservoir of the Dona Francisca Hydroelectric Plant on the upper Jacuí River.

References

See also
List of municipalities in Rio Grande do Sul

Municipalities in Rio Grande do Sul